The 2nd Tennessee Cavalry Regiment was a cavalry regiment that served in the Union Army during the American Civil War.  It was also known as 2nd East Tennessee Cavalry.

Service
The 2nd Tennessee Cavalry was organized July through November 1862 in eastern Tennessee and mustered in for a three year enlistment under the command of Colonel Daniel M. Ray. Subordinate officers included Lieutenant Colonel William R. Cook, and majors George W. Hutsell, Charles Inman, William R. Macbeth, and William F. Prosser.  The unit was composed primarily of Southern loyalists from the Tennessee counties of Knox, Sevier and Blount. Notably, among the enlisted were two women pretending to be men: Frances Elizabeth Quinn and Sarah Bradbury. The regiment's original muster rolls were destroyed at Nolensville, Tennessee on December 30, 1862.  The regiment re-mustered at Murfreesboro, Tennessee on January 26, 1863.

Detailed service

Casualties
The regiment lost a total of 224 men during service; 2 officers and 14 enlisted men killed or mortally wounded, 208 enlisted men died of disease or accident.

Commanders
 Colonel Daniel M. Ray
 Lieutenant Colonel William R. Cook - commanded at the battles of Chickamauga and Nashville

See also

 List of Tennessee Civil War units
 Tennessee in the Civil War

References

 Andes, John W. and Will A. McTeer. Loyal Mountain Troopers: The Second and Third Tennessee Volunteer Cavalry in the Civil War, Reminiscences of Lieutenant John W. Andes and Major Will A. McTeer (Maryville, TN:  Blount County Genealogical and Historical Society), 1992.
 Dyer, Frederick H.  A Compendium of the War of the Rebellion (Des Moines, IA:  Dyer Pub. Co.), 1908.
Attribution

External links
 Brief unit history, including officers' names, regimental strengths, etc.

Military units and formations established in 1862
Military units and formations disestablished in 1865
Units and formations of the Union Army from Tennessee
1865 disestablishments in Tennessee
1862 establishments in Tennessee